Ethel Griffies (born Ethel Woods; 26 April 1878 – 9 September 1975) was an English actress of stage, screen, and television. She is remembered for portraying the ornithologist Mrs. Bundy in Alfred Hitchcock's classic The Birds (1963). She appeared in stage roles in her native England and in the United States, and had featured roles in around 100 motion pictures. Griffies was one of the oldest working actors in the English-speaking theatre at the time of her death at 97 years old. She acted alongside such stars as May Whitty, Ellen Terry, and Anna Neagle.

Biography
Griffies was born in Sheffield, West Riding of Yorkshire, the daughter of actor and manager Samuel Rupert Woods and actress Lillie Roberts. Taken onstage at the age of three, she continued to act for the next 86 years.

Griffies married actor Walter Beaumont in 1900, and he died in 1910. In 1917, she married actor Edward Cooper,  who predeceased his wife by almost two decades.

On 9 September 1975, in London, Griffies died of a stroke.

Career
Griffies appeared in numerous plays, making her theatre debut in London in 1899. Having made brief cameos in films since 1917, she started a full career in the industry by 1930 in the film version of the play Old English, and appeared in her more than 90 film and television roles in a career that lasted until her retirement in 1967. She played Grace Poole in two versions of Jane Eyre, the 1934 Monogram version and the better-known 1943 version. One of her last well-known roles was the elderly ornithologist Mrs. Bundy in Alfred Hitchcock's The Birds (1963). She also performed in Billy Liar, the same year as The Birds.

Partial filmography

 The Cost of a Kiss (1917)
 Hard Cash (1920) – Mrs. Hardie
 Sweet Kitty Bellairs (1930) – Gossip (uncredited)
 Old English (1930) – Adela Heythorp
 The Millionaire (1931) – Mrs. Andrews (uncredited)
 Chances (1931) – Drunken Flower Vendor in Pub (uncredited)
 Waterloo Bridge (1931) – Mrs. Hobley, Landlady
 The Road to Singapore (1931) – Mrs. Everard (uncredited)
 Once a Lady (1931) – Miss Bleeker
 Manhattan Parade (1931) – Mrs. Beacon (uncredited)
 Union Depot (1932) – Cross Woman at Magazine Stand (uncredited)
 The Impatient Maiden (1932) – Nurse Lovett
 Are You Listening? (1932) – Mrs. Peters
 Devil's Lottery (1932) – Nurse (uncredited)
 Westward Passage (1932) – Lady Caverly
 Love Me Tonight (1932) – Second Aunt
 Payment Deferred (1932) – Customer in Madame Collins' Dress Shop (uncredited)
 Evenings for Sale (1932) – Boat Passenger (uncredited)
 Tonight Is Ours (1933) – Zana
 A Lady's Profession (1933) – Lady McDougal
 Looking forward (1933) – Miss Judd (uncredited)
 Horse Play (1933) – Emily
 Midnight Club (1933) – The Duchess
 Torch Singer (1933) – Agatha Alden
 Doctor Bull (1933) – Miss Ace (uncredited)
 Bombshell (1933) – Mrs. Ward – Orphanage Representative (uncredited)
 White Woman (1933) – Mrs. Chisholm
 Alice in Wonderland (1933) – Miss Simpson the Governess (uncredited)
 Four Frightened People (1934) – Mrs. Ainger's mother
 The House of Rothschild (1934) – Guest at Reception Hall
 Stolen Sweets (1934) – Ship Passenger (uncredited)
 Sadie McKee (1934) – Woman in Subway (uncredited)
 Call It Luck (1934) – Lady Poindexter (uncredited)
 Jane Eyre (1934) – Grace Poole
 Bulldog Drummond Strikes Back (1934) – Mrs. Field
 We Live Again (1934) – Aunt Marie
 The Painted Veil (1934) – Lady Coldchester (uncredited)
 Enchanted April (1935) – Mrs. Hawkins (uncredited)
 The Mystery of Edwin Drood (1935) – Miss Twinkleton
 Vanessa: Her Love Story (1935) – Winifred Trent
 Hold 'Em Yale (1935) – Mrs. Peavey (uncredited)
 Werewolf of London (1935) – Mrs. Whack
 Anna Karenina (1935) – Mme. Kartasov
 The Return of Peter Grimm (1935) – Mrs. Martha Bartholomew
 Twice Branded (1936) – Mrs. Etta Hamilton
 Not So Dusty (1936) – Miss Miller
 Guilty Melody (1936) – Lady Rochester
 Kathleen Mavourneen (1938) – Hannah O'Dwyer
 Crackerjack (1938) – Annie
 The Mysterious Mr. Davis (1939) – Mabel Wilcox (uncredited)
 Over the Moon (1939) – Miss Bates – the governess (uncredited)
 I'm from Missouri (1939) – Miss Wildhack
 The Star Maker (1939) – Voice Teacher
 We Are Not Alone (1939) – Mrs. Raymond
 Vigil in the Night (1940) – Matron East
 Irene (1940) – Princess Minetti
 Waterloo Bridge (1940) – Mrs. Clark – Landlady (uncredited)
 Anne of Windy Poplars (1940) – Hester Pringle
 Stranger on the Third Floor (1940) – Mrs. Kane, Michael's landlady
 Dead Men Tell (1941) – Miss Patience Nodbury 
 Billy the Kid (1941) – Mrs. Hanky
 A Yank in the R.A.F. (1941) – Lady Fitzhugh
 Man at Large (1941) – Mrs. Zagra
 Great Guns (1941) – Aunt Agatha
 How Green Was My Valley (1941) – Mrs. Nicholas, housekeeper
 Remember the Day (1941) – Undetermined Role (uncredited)
 Right to the Heart (1942) – Minerva Bromley
 Son of Fury: The Story of Benjamin Blake (1942) – Matron (uncredited)
 Castle in the Desert (1942) – Madame Saturnia
 The Postman Didn't Ring (1942) – Catherine Vandewater
 Between Us Girls (1942) – Gallagher
 Mrs. Wiggs of the Cabbage Patch (1942) – Mrs. Graham (uncredited)
 Time to Kill (1942) – Mrs. Murdock
 Forever and a Day (1943) – Wife of Man in Air Raid Shelter
 First Comes Courage (1943) – Nurse (uncredited)
 Holy Matrimony (1943) – Lady Vale
 Jane Eyre (1943) – Grace Poole (uncredited)
 Pardon My Rhythm (1944) – Mrs. Dean
 The White Cliffs of Dover (1944) – Woman on Train Opening Window (uncredited)
 It Happened Tomorrow (1944) – Mrs. O'Connor, Boardinghouse Tenant (uncredited)
 The Keys of the Kingdom (1944) – Mrs. Glennie (scenes deleted)
 Music for Millions (1944) – Mrs. McGuff
 The Horn Blows at Midnight (1945) – Lady Stover
 Thrill of a Romance (1945) – Mrs. Fenway
 Molly and Me (1945) – Mrs. Lamb (uncredited)
 The Strange Affair of Uncle Harry (1945) – Mrs. Nelson (uncredited)
 Saratoga Trunk (1945) – Clarissa Van Steed
 Devotion (1946) – Aunt Elizabeth Branwell
 Sing While You Dance (1946) – Mrs. Abigail Smith
 The Brasher Doubloon (1947) – Undetermined Secondary Role (uncredited)
 Millie's Daughter (1947) – Aunt Katherine
 The Homestretch (1947) – Aunt Martha
 The Birds (1963) – Mrs. Bundy, ornithologist
 Billy Liar (1963) – Grandma Florence
 Bus Riley's Back in Town (1965) – Mrs. Spencer

References

External links

1878 births
1975 deaths
English film actresses
English stage actresses
English television actresses
Actresses from Sheffield
Actresses from London
20th-century English actresses